Cappelle-Brouck (from Dutch meaning "chapel marsh"; Kapellebroek in modern Dutch spelling) is a commune in the Nord department in northern France.

Heraldry

See also
Communes of the Nord department

References

Cappellebrouck
French Flanders